Golden thread may refer to:

 Golden thread (law), a legal judgment famous for iterating the duty inherent on the Prosecution to prove the prisoner's guilt beyond a reasonable doubt
 The Golden Thread, the second book in the three-book novel A Tale of Two Cities
 Golden Thread (fish), a bream fish popular and eaten mostly in Asian countries.
 Cuscuta pacifica, a species of dodder plant commonly known as goldenthread.
 Coptis trifolia, a circumboreal plant in the Buttercup family commonly known as threeleaf goldenthread.
Golden thread of information, a term used in construction to describe digital information management processes used to support building safety. In the UK, the Ministry of Housing, Communities and Local Government (MHCLG) approved a formal definition of the term in June 2021.

See also

 Gold thread